Giachinoana is a genus of beetle in the family Carabidae. The only species in the genus is Giachinoana carinipennis.

References

Lebiinae